Glyphipterix sulcosa is a moth of the  family Glyphipterigidae. It is found on Sardinia.

References

Moths described in 1978
Glyphipterigidae
Endemic fauna of Italy
Moths of Europe